

VHF

Japan

People's Republic of China

Original P.R.C. channel assignments

Assignments since c.1975

Republic of China (Taiwan)

Indonesia

Kingdom of Thailand, North Korat, other border of island 

Similar to the television frequency in America and Japan; same sound carrier as System M / N that uses 4.5 MHz sound carrier

North Yala 

Channels 2,3,7 to 13 uses 4.5 MHz sound carrier (System N), Channel 4 uses 5 MHz carrier (system Y), Channels 5 and 6 uses 6.5 MHz sound carrier (system D)

Russia,Kazakhstan,Turkmenistan,Azerbaijan,North Korea, Vietnam and most Central Asia

UHF

Japan

People's Republic of China

NOTE: The original assignments of Channels 25 to 57 were 2 MHz higher in frequency until c.1984. Channels 58 to 62 were deleted at this time.

Indonesia,Singapore,Malaysia and most Asia,Middle East

Hong Kong and Macau

See also
Broadcast television systems
ATSC (standards)
Multichannel television sound
NTSC
NTSC-J
PAL
RCA
SECAM
Moving image formats
Early television stations
Knife-edge effect
Channel 37
North American broadcast television frequencies
North American cable television frequencies
Australasian television frequencies

External links
U.S. cable television channel frequencies
TVTower.com - Commercial Television Frequencies

Television technology

es:Frecuencias de los canales de televisión
pt:Frequências dos canais de televisão